Russia participated in the Junior Eurovision Song Contest 2018 which took place on 25 November 2018 in Minsk, Belarus.

Background

The twin sisters went on to become the first act from a Junior Eurovision Song Contest to represent their country at the Eurovision Song Contest, performing the song "Shine" at the Eurovision Song Contest 2014, in Copenhagen, Denmark. In the 2017 contest, Polina Bogusevich represented her country in Tbilisi, Georgia with the song "Wings".She won the contest with a total of 188 points.

Before Junior Eurovision

Akademiya Eurovision 2018 
The Russian national final took place on 3 June 2018 at the children's camp Artek, on the Crimean Peninsula. However, it aired the next day on Carousel. The entries had been previously released on 27 May 2018.

Final 
The national final was won by the 13-year-old Anna Filipchuk with the song "Nepobedimy".

Artist and song information

Anna Filipchuk
Anna Filipchuk (born 9 November 2004) is a Russian child singer and TV presenter. She represented Russia in the Junior Eurovision Song Contest 2018 with the song "Unbreakable".

Anna currently studies at the Igor Krutoy Academy, alongside practising rhythmic gymnastics. As well as singing, the young star has experience in TV presenting.

Unbreakable
"Unbreakable" (Nepobedimy) is a song by the Russian child singer Anna Filipchuk. It represented Russia at the Junior Eurovision Song Contest 2018 placing 10th with 122 points.

At Junior Eurovision
During the opening ceremony and the running order draw which both took place on 19 November 2018, Russia was drawn to perform fifth on 25 November 2018, following Albania and preceding the Netherlands.

Voting

Detailed voting results

References

Junior Eurovision Song Contest
Russia
2018